The three Ardent-class torpedo boat destroyers ("Thornycroft  ") were ordered by the British Admiralty on 12 October 1893  and served with the Royal Navy.

As was typical for torpedo craft at the time, the Admiralty left detailed design to the builders, laying down only broad requirements.

The Ardent-class were derived from the preceding  Daring class, but were larger and more powerfully engined. It was originally intended that they would be armed with one 12-pounder quick-firing gun forward and three 6-pounder guns, mounted on the broadside and aft, and three 18-inch torpedo tubes, one fixed in a bow mount and two on a revolving mount abaft the two funnels; however the fixed bow tube fitted in the preceding '26-knotter' type had subsequently been found to throw up too much spray and was removed, and in October 1893 it was agreed that the bow tube should be omitted, giving "a clean sharp stem with no projections" and instead two extra 6-pounder guns were installed en echelon amidships. These three ships - and the similar three Charger Class destroyers (ordered from Yarrow in the same week) - were the first TBDs to omit this fixed bow tube. They carried a complement of 2 officers and 48 ratings (comprising 20 deck department and 28 engine room compartment).

These three ship met the speed requirement of 27 knots for which they were designed. Over the measured mile and in three-hour trials they averaged the following power (ihp) and speed:

At her second preliminary trial, Ardent reached 29 knots with 407 r.p.m., the engines developing 5,044 ihp. However, Boxer was the fastest British destroyer among all the 27-knotters, her best run over the measured mile being 30¾ knots.

In September 1913 the Admiralty re-classed all the remaining 27-knotter destroyers as A Class; this applied to both Boxer and Bruiser, although the Ardent herself had already been scrapped. Bruiser was sold for scrap eight months later, prior to the start of WW1, while Boxer was the oldest destroyer in service in the Royal Navy during the First World War, although the oldest destroyer-type vessel was the large 'torpedo boat/torpedo boat chaser' TB.81 (ex-Swift), a destroyer precursor.

Vessels in class

Notes

Bibliography

 

 
Destroyer classes
Ship classes of the Royal Navy